Kalyani Das (1907–1983) was an Indian revolutionary and nationalist from Bengal.

Education 
She was a student of Ravenshaw Collegiate School, Cuttack. Das finished her Bachelor of Arts degree in 1928.

Participation in India's freedom struggle 
Das was a member of Chhatri Sangha, a semi-revolutionary organisation for women in Kolkata. In 1930, she led a protest of female students against Governor of Bengal. She was arrested for her anti-governor activity on 1932. Her classmate Kamala Das Gupta was arrested at the same time.

Death 
Das died on 16 February 1983.

Works
She edited a book called Bengal Speaks (published in 1944), and dedicated it to her sister Bina Das.

References

1907 births
1983 deaths
Revolutionary movement for Indian independence
Brahmos
Indian National Congress politicians from West Bengal
Bengali Hindus
20th-century Indian women politicians
20th-century Indian politicians
20th-century Indian educators
People from Krishnagar
Women in West Bengal politics
Prisoners and detainees of British India
Female revolutionaries
Indian independence activists from West Bengal